Pleasant Township is one of the fifteen townships of Hardin County, Ohio, United States. As of the 2010 census the population was 8,338, of whom 1,455 lived in the unincorporated portions of the township.

Geography
Located in the eastern center of the county, it borders the following townships:
Blanchard Township - north
Jackson Township - northeast
Goshen Township - east
Dudley Township - southeast
Buck Township - south
Cessna Township - west
Washington Township - northwest corner

Most of the city of Kenton, the county seat of Hardin County, is located in southern Pleasant Township.

Name and history
Pleasant Township was established in 1834. This township was so named on account of its scenery and agriculture. It is one of fifteen Pleasant Townships statewide.

Government
The township is governed by a three-member board of trustees, who are elected in November of odd-numbered years to a four-year term beginning on the following January 1. Two are elected in the year after the presidential election and one is elected in the year before it. There is also an elected township fiscal officer, who serves a four-year term beginning on April 1 of the year after the election, which is held in November of the year before the presidential election. Vacancies in the fiscal officership or on the board of trustees are filled by the remaining trustees.

References

External links
County website

Townships in Hardin County, Ohio
Townships in Ohio
1834 establishments in Ohio
Populated places established in 1834